Vallabhacharya Mahaprabhu (1479–1531 CE), also known as Vallabha, Mahaprabhuji and Vishnuswami, or Vallabha Acharya, is a Hindu Indian saint and philosopher who founded the Krishna-centered PushtiMarg sect of Vaishnavism in the Braj(Vraj) region of India, and the Vedanta philosophy of Shuddha Advaita (Pure Non-dualism).

He is the Jagadguru Acharya and Guru of the Pushti Marg bhakti tradition and Suddhadwait Brahmavad (Vedant Philosophy), which he founded after his own interpretation of the Vedanta philosophy.

Vallabhacharya was born in a Telugu Tailang Brahmin family that had been currently residing in Varanasi, who escaped to Champaran of Chhattisgarh state while expecting shri Vallabha, expecting a Muslim invasion in Varanasi, during the late 15th century. The name Vallabha means the beloved or lover, and is a name of Vishnu and Krishna.

Vallabhacharya studied the Vedas, Upanishads, Puranas, Shat Darshan as a child, then travelled throughout the Indian subcontinent over 20 years. He became one of the important leaders of the devotional Bhakti movement. Vallabhacharya's mother was Illamma who was the daughter of a family priest serving the rulers of the empire of Vijayanagara.  The biographies written by his followers, just like those for other Bhakti leaders, claim that he won many philosophical scholarly debates against the followers of Adi Shankracharya, Ramanuja, Madhvacharya and others, had visions and miracles.

He rejected asceticism and monastic life, suggested that through loving devotion to God Krishna, any householder could achieve salvation – an idea that became influential all over India, proven by Vallabh Digvijay, Sampraday Pradep, Sampraday Kalpadrum and his 84 Baithakjis (Places of worship) in Uttar Pradesh, Rajasthan, Gujarat, Maharashtra, Tamil Nadu, Andhra Pradesh, Karnataka, Kerala, Uttaranchal, Madhya Pradesh, Orissa, Goa, Sindh and various other parts of Indian subcontinent. He is associated with Vishnuswami Sampraday, and is the prominent Jagadguru Acharya of Rudra Sampradaya out of the four traditional Vaishnava Sampradayas.

He authored many texts including but not limited to, the Anubhashya colloquially also called BrahmaSutrAnubhashya (his commentary on Brahm Sutra), Shodash Granth or sixteen 'stotras' (tracts) and several commentaries on the Bhagavata Purana.

Vallabha's writings and kirtan compositions focus on baby Krishna and his childhood pranks with Yashoda (unconditional motherly love), as well as a youthful Krishna's protection of the good (divine grace) and his victory over demons and evils, all with allegory and symbolism.

His legacy is best preserved with the acharyas of his Pushtimarg Vallabh Sampraday, also in the Braj region, and particularly at Nathdwara and Dwarkadhish Temple in Mewar region of India – are important Krishna pilgrimage center.

He is regarded as an incarnation of Agni (Vaishwanar Agni Swaroop of Shri Krishna's face).

Life

Childhood

The ancestors of Vallabhacharya hailed from the Andhra region and belonged to a long line of Somyagya Performing Telugu Vaidiki Brahmins known as Velanadu or Vellanatiya following the Vishnu Swami school of thought. According to devotional accounts, Krishna commanded his ancestor Yagnanarayana Bhatta that he would take birth in their family after completion of 100 Somayagnas (fire sacrifices). By the time of Yagnanarayana's descendant Lakshmana Bhatta who migrated to the holy town of Varanasi, the family had completed 100 Somayagnas. Vallabhacharya was born to Shri Lakshmana Bhatta and his wife IllammaGaru in 1479 CE (V.S. 1535) on the 11th day of the dark half of lunar month of chaitra at Champaranya, now in Chhattisgarh.

The period surrounding Vallabhacharya's birth was a tumultuous one and most of northern and central India was being influenced by Muslim invaders. It was common for populations to migrate in order to flee from religious persecution and conversion. On one such occasion, Shri Lakshmana Bhatta had to urgently move out of Varanasi with his pregnant wife. Due to terror and physical strain of the flight suffered by the mother, there was a premature birth of the child, two months in advance. As the child did not show signs of life, the distressed parents placed  Vallabh under a tree wrapped in a piece of cloth. Krishna appeared in a dream before the parents of Vallabhacharya and signified that He Himself had taken birth as the child who they had left under a tree mistaken to be not alive. According to popular accounts, the parents rushed to the spot and were amazed to find their baby alive and protected by a circle of divine fire. The blessed mother extended her arms into the fire unscathed; she received from the fire the divine baby, gleefully to her bosom. The child was named Vallabha (meaning "the dear one" in Sanskrit).

Education
His education commenced at the age of seven with the study of four Vedas, Upnishads, Puranas, Shat Darshan. He acquired mastery over the books expounding the six systems of Indian philosophy. He also learnt and studied philosophical systems of Adi Sankara, Ramanuja, Madhva, Nimbarka along with the Buddhist, Jain, Cārvāka,etc schools. He was able to recite a hundred mantras, not only from beginning to end but also in reverse order. At Vyankateshwar and Lakshmana Balaji, he made a strong impression on the public as an embodiment of knowledge. He was now applauded as Bala Saraswati.

After being finished all education at the young age of 11, he went to Vrindavan.

Grand victory at Vijayanagara
In the court of King Krishnadevaraya of the Vijaynagar Empire, a debate was conducted at Vijayanagara between the Vaishnavaites of Madhva(followers of Madhvacharya) and Shankars(followers of Adi Shankracharya) over the philosophical question whether God is Dualistic or non-dualistic. Vallabhacharya participated in the discussion.

At the age of 11, Vallabhacharya, who had earned an epithet of Bala Saraswati was given the opportunity to discuss the question.  The scholarly debate continued for 27 days in the conference hall and won the shastratha. He was honoured with the kanakabhishekam ceremony by the Emperor Krishnadevaraya and other acharyas and learned pandits on his grand victory. The titles of ‘Acharya’ and 'Jagadguru' (world preceptor) were conferred on him. He was offered vessels of gold weighing a hundred maunds. Vallabhacharya Mahaprabhu politely declined to accept them and distributed them among the poor learned brahmins and kept only seven gold mohurs. They were used for preparing the ornaments of Vithoba (Vitthalanatha) in Pandharpur.

Pilgrimage of India (prithvi parikrama)
Vallabhacharya performed three pilgrimages(Digvijay Yatra) of India, barefoot. These three pilgrimages of India are known as Prithvi Parikrama or Vallabh Digvijay in Pushtimarg Literature.

He gave discourses on Bhagavata at 84 places and explained the meanings of the Puranic text. This 84 places are known as Chaurāsi Baithak (चौरासी बैठक) and now they are places of pilgrimage. He stayed in Vraja for four months in each year.

Establishment of Pushtimarg Vallabh Sampraday

It is believed that when Vallabhacharya Mahaprabhu entered shri Gokul, he thought about the important question of restoring people to the right path of devotion.

He meditated on Krishna who then directly appeared in front of him in the form of Shrinathji, and disclosed the 'Brahma Sambandha' (Sanskrit for "relation with Brahman, the supreme Godhead"), a mantra of self dedication or consecration of self to Krishna.

During that time Damodardasa, his disciple, was sleeping next to him. In the early morning, Vallabhacharya related this experience to Damodardasa and asked him — “Damala, did you hear any thing last night”? Damodaradasa replied that "I heard but was not able to understand." Vallabhacharya then explained the meaning of the mantra and at that time he became the first Vaishnava initiated by Vallabhacharya.

Vallabhacharya wanted to preach his message of devotion to God and God’s grace called Pushtimarg (path of grace). He undertook three pilgrimages of India. He performed the initiation ceremony of religious rite by conferring on them the ‘Nama Nivedana’ mantra or the ‘Brahma Sambandha’ mantra. Thousands of people became his disciples, but 84 devoted servants are most famous and their life has been documented in Pushtimarg literature as the ‘Story of 84 Vaishnavas’. He also met Vyas in his Himalayan cave and discussed Krishna and his flute.

He created the Siddhant Rahashya granth telling word-to-word instructions he received regarding Brahma Sambandh that day.

Personal life
He intended to remain a lifelong celibate brahmachary but the deity-guru Vithoba of Pandharpur commanded him to marry and live the life of a householder, and Shrinathji himself said that He would be born as the second child of Vallabha, Gusaiji (as Vallabha's first child Gopinathji is the form of Balram).

Obeying this, following his caste traditions and practices, Vallabh married Mahalaxmi, a kashi resident girl of his own Tailang Velanadu Brahmin caste and had two sons, Gopinathji and Vitthalnathji (also known as Gusainji).

Death
At the age of 52, he is said to have returned to Goloka (Shri Krishna's heavenly adobe) via samadhi in the Ganga river in Hanuman Ghat of Kashi.

Based on Pushti Marg literature, in about 1530 A.D., Shrinathji commanded Vallabhacharya to leave the worldly life and to come near him. It is said that Shrinathji had previously expressed his wish on two different occasions. The third command was accepted by Vallabhacharya as the last verdict.

He reached Kasi and according to Vedic traditions, formally renounced the world by taking Tridand Vaishnav Sanyasa and a vow of silence. He lived in a hut made of leaves on the Hanuman ghat for about a week. He spent his last days in contemplation of Krishna and suffered agonies of separation from him.

His sons Gopinathji and Vithalnathji Gusaiji along with Shri Vallabh's all devotees, followers and admirers  assembled near him for his last darshan. When asked about his advice, Vallabhacharya scribbled three and a half Sanskrit verses in the sand by way of counsel. To complete this message, it is believed that Krishna Himself manifested visually on the spot and wrote in the form of a verse and a half. This collection of verses is known as ‘ShikshaSloki’ in Pushti Marg literature.

Later he entered into the waters of the Ganges on the day of Rath Yatra (a festival that is celebrated on the second or third day of the bright side of the lunar month of Ashadha). People are said to have witnessed a brilliant flame as he arose from the water and ascended to Goloka (Param Brahma Shri Krishna's heavenly abode) and was lost in the firmament.

In Pushtimarg this episode is known as AsurVyamohLila. ShriVallabh is eternal and immortal. It is said that in his AsurVyamohLila (travel to the heavenly abode), he left this world and traveled to Goloka to serve Krishna.

Works
Vallabhacharya composed many philosophical and devotional books during his lifetime which includes:

 Anubhashya or BrahmSutrnubhashya – 4 cantos of commentaries on the Brahm Sutra of Ved Vyas
 Tattvaarth Dip Nibandh – Essays on the fundamental principles of spirituality (3 chapters)
 Chapter 1: Shaastrarth Prakaran
 Chapter 2: Bhagavatarth Prakaran
 Chapter 3: Sarvanirnay Prakaran
 Subodhini – Commentary on Shrimad Bhagavat Mahapuran (only cantos 1, 2, 3 and 10 are available)
 Shodash Granth – Sixteen short verse-type compositions to teach his followers about devotional life
 Purvamimamsa-Bhashya-Karika
 Bhashya on 7 Mimamsa Sutra 
 Madhurastakam

Other than the above main literature, he also composed additional works such as Patravalamban, Madhurashtakam, Gayatribhashya, Purushottam Sahastranaam, Girirajdharyashtakam, Nandkumarashtakam, etc.

Commentaries and Verses (c. 1479–1531)
He wrote elaborate commentaries on Sanskrit scriptures, the Brahma-Sutras (Anubhasya), GayatriBhashya(Bhashya Commentry on Gayatri Mantra), and Shreemad Bhagwatam (Shree Subodhini ji, Tattvarth Dip Nibandh's Bhagwatartha Prakaran).

Shodash Granthas
Also, in order to help devotees on this path of devotion, he wrote 16 pieces in verse which we know as the Shodasha Granthas. These came about as answers to devotees. The verses define the practical theology of Pushtimarga.

The Shodash Granthas (doctrines) serve as a lighthouse for devotees. They speak about increasing love for Shri Krishna through Seva (service) and Smarana (remembering). These doctrines are Mahaprabhu’s way of encouraging and inspiring devotees on this path of grace. The central message of the Shodasha Granthas is total surrender to the Lord. A Goswami can initiate an eager soul to this path of Shri Krishna’s loving devotion and service. The verses explain the types of devotees, the way to surrender and the reward for Seva, as well as other practical instructions. The devotee is nurtured by the Lord’s grace.

 Shree Yamunastakam: An ode to Shree Yamuna Maharani
 Baala Bodhah: A guide for beginners on the path of devotion
 Siddhant-Muktavali: A string of pearls consisting of the principles/fundamentals of Pushtimarg
 Pusti-Pravaha-Maryadabhedah: The different characteristics of the different types of souls (Receptivity of the Lord’s grace)
 Siddhant-Rahasya: The Secret behind the Principles
 Navratna : Nine jewels of instructions (Priceless instructions for a devotee)
 Antah-Karan-Prabodhah: Consoling one's Heart (Request to one’s own heart)
 Vivek-Dhairy-Aashray: Of discretion, patience and surrender
 Shree Krushna Aashray: Taking Shree Krushna’s shelter
 Chatuhshloki: A Four Verses (Verser) illustrating the four principles of life; Dharma, Arth, Kaam, Moksh of a Vaishnav 
 Bhakti-Vardhini: Increase of devotion
 Jal-Bhed: Categories and qualities of a good speaker.
Pancha-Padyaani: Five instructive verses on categories and qualities of a listner
Sannyasa-Nirnayah: Decision on taking Renunciation
Nirodh-Lakshanam: Identifying characteristics of detachment
Seva-Phalam: The reward of performing seva (worship) of the Lord

Postage Stamp
On 14 April 1977, the Indian postal department, Government of India issued in his honor, a commemorative stamp bearing the image of Vallabhacharya.

See also
 
Bhagavata
Vyasa
Champaran (Chhattisgarh)
Krishna
Shrinathji
Para Brahman
Pushtimarg
Ramanuja
Madhvacharya
Nimbarka
Shuddhadvaita
Brahma Sutras

References

Bibliography
 Sri Subodhini, first time English Translation, 25 Vols./ Delhi
 Barz, Richard K. The Bhakti Sect of Vallabhacarya. Delhi: Thomson Press. 1976

External links
 
 Vallabha at Encyclopædia Britannica 
 The Philosophy of Vallabha, Surendranath Dasgupta, 1940
 Pushtipedia.com at Encyclopedia on Pushtimarga 

1479 births
1531 deaths
Bhakti movement
Indian Hindu spiritual teachers
16th-century Hindu philosophers and theologians
16th-century Indian philosophers
Indian Vaishnavites
Vaishnava saints
People from Raipur district
People from Raipur, Chhattisgarh
Telugu people